Esquiule is a commune in the Pyrénées-Atlantiques department in south-western France.

It is located in the former province of Béarn. It stands out as an outpost of the Basque area of Soule, the village being historically Basque speaking. It has often played host to the carnivalesque performances known as maskaradak and its inhabitants arranged and performed one traditional theatre piece of Soule (pastorala) under the title Madalena de Jaureguiberry in 2000.

See also
Communes of the Pyrénées-Atlantiques department

References

Communes of Pyrénées-Atlantiques
Pyrénées-Atlantiques communes articles needing translation from French Wikipedia